Peterson Creek is a river in the Ottawa River drainage basin in Lanark Highlands, Lanark County and North Frontenac, Frontenac County in eastern Ontario, Canada. It flows  from and unnamed lake to its mouth at the South Branch Clyde River.

Course
It flows east to Cruse Lake, then turns northeast and passes through Bobs Lake, takes in an unnamed left tributary arriving from Mountain Lake, and reaches Chathams Lake. The creek continues northeast, passes into Lanark Highlands township, takes in an unnamed left tributary arriving from Twin Lake, and heads east. The Clyde River flows via the Mississippi River to the Ottawa River.

See also
List of rivers of Ontario

References

Rivers of Frontenac County
Rivers of Lanark County